Joe Conley (March 3, 1928 – July 7, 2013) was an American actor who played many small roles on television and is most remembered for his role as the storekeeper Ike Godsey in The Waltons.

Personal life and career
Joe Conley was born in Buffalo, New York. He started acting after returning from military service in Korea, and was running three real-estate agencies in the San Fernando Valley area of Los Angeles by the early 1970s after beginning this second career in 1961. While acting, he continued to work in real estate and, as a result, became wealthy.

By the early 1970s, his career as an actor was in limbo. After twenty years of small parts in mainly television shows, he performed with Pat Harrington in an AT&T educational film called How to Lose Your Best Customer Without Even Trying before he was cast as storekeeper Ike Godsey in The Waltons. Conley was paired with Ronnie Claire Edwards, who portrayed his bossy wife Corabeth Walton Godsey; their characters married in the show during 1975. In 2009, Conley published his autobiography, Ike Godsey of Walton's Mountain.

He was married to and divorced from Jacqueline Stakes, with whom he had two children. He married 	 
Louise Teecher in 1969 and had two children with her.

Death
Conley died on July 7, 2013, at a care facility in Newbury Park, California of complications from dementia. He was 85 and is survived by his wife, three daughters and son.

Filmography

References

Bibliography
Zoobilee Zoo (1986)
Ike Godsey of Walton's Mountain. Albany: BearManor Media, 2010. .

External links

1928 births
2013 deaths
Male actors from Buffalo, New York
American male film actors
American male television actors
Deaths from dementia in California
Writers from Buffalo, New York
20th-century American male actors
21st-century American male actors
The Waltons